The Interscholastic Athletic Association of Maryland (IAAM) is an association of schools that organize the junior and varsity female athletic programs in the area in and around the Baltimore Metro area. It is headquartered in Pasadena, Maryland.

Background
The IAAM was formed in 1999, by combining two existing girls' athletic leagues, A.I.S. and the Catholic League.

Varsity team sports

Member schools

Notes and references

External links
 IAAM official website

Maryland high school sports conferences
Pasadena, Maryland